Picquet may refer to:

An alternative spelling for Picket
Picquet (military), a small temporary military post closer to the enemy than the main formation; or a group of soldiers detailed for a specific duty (e.g., fire picquet)
Picquet (punishment), a form of military punishment in vogue in the 16th and 17th centuries in Europe

People
François Picquet (1708–1781), Sulpician priest who came to Montreal from France in 1734
Count Toussaint-Guillaume Picquet de la Motte (1720–1791), French admiral
Aimé Picquet du Boisguy (1776–1839), French chouan general during the French Revolution
Louisa Picquet (c. 1828,–1896), American whose life became the subject of a biography Louisa Picquet, the Octoroon, or, Inside Views of Southern Domestic Life
Christian Picquet, pseudonym of Christian Lamothe (born 1952), French activist and politician

See also

 La Motte-Picquet (disambiguation)
 
 Picket (disambiguation)
 Pickett (disambiguation)
 Piquet (disambiguation), another alternative spelling for picket
 Piquette (disambiguation)